Sheetal Menon is an Indian model and actress. Her origin is Kerala and Mangalore.

Menon is trained in Bharatanatyam and Odissi classical dance, trained under Guru Smt. Shobha. Menon (Nasik) and Guru Smt. Daksha Mashruwala (Mumbai).
She began her career as a model and made her mark as one of the established faces in the modelling industry. Later she was signed on with the agency headed by Atul Kasbekar. She was a face of many leading lifestyle Brands and a Kingfisher Model in the year 2005 and 2008.

During her final year in college, she joined Anupam Kher's course, Actor Prepares. Her first acting role came in Nari Hira's Bhram – An Illusion directed by Pawan Kaul. Her films include Shaitan (2011), directed by Bejoy Nambiar, Julayi (Telugu) (2012) and David (2013).

Filmography

Web series

References

External links
Sheetal Menon at Bollywood Hungama

Living people
21st-century Indian actresses
Indian film actresses
Actresses in Hindi cinema
Year of birth missing (living people)
Actresses in Tamil cinema
Female models from Bangalore
Female models from Kerala